Cipollone v. Liggett Group, Inc., 505 U.S. 504 (1992), was a United States Supreme Court case. In a split opinion, the Court held that the Surgeon General's warning  did not preclude lawsuits by smokers against tobacco companies on the basis of several claims. The case examined whether tobacco companies could be liable for not warning the consumer "adequately" of the dangers of  cigarettes as well as ultimately held the stance that smoking was in fact a free choice. The ruling also questioned the Cigarette Labeling and Advertising Act of 1965 to determine whether the warning labels on the cigarette products by law had to be less or more alarming than the warning issued .

The warning at issue said: "Warning: The Surgeon General has determined that cigarette smoking is dangerous to your health."

The court's holding and some of Justice Stevens's reasoning enjoyed majority support, but the opinion eventually gained full majority support 16 years later in Altria Group v. Good.

Background 
The relationship that the American people has had with tobacco companies can be said to be tumultuous and is documented. Tobacco has always been a staple economic resource in the fabric of the American economy, even in trade amongst Native American tribes. Tobacco crops were instrumental in the early economic development of the United States in colonial times. Following this period was a rise in the cigarette. Tobacco and smoking began to be engraved in the culture and lifestyle of the American public, associated with things such as "sexy, cool, masculine".

The popularity of tobacco was soon replaced with skepticism and many wanting to know the health risks of smoking. Research and analysis followed in order to understand these risks, with shocking conclusions and connections to diseases( coronary disease, coronary heart disease, peripheral arterial occlusive disease, cerebrovascular disease, lung cancer, cancer of the larynx, oral cancer, cancer of the esophagus, cancer of the bladder, cancer of the pancreas) that left many in shock. Public Health advocates urged for the banning of cigarette sales and the overall production of cigarettes in order to protect the public.

With the battle between tobacco companies and public health advocates ensuing, litigation against tobacco companies became the next step. From the 1950s on, there began to be litigation filed against tobacco companies to be liable for injuries and/or consequences from smoking cigarettes. Cases such as Pritchard v. Liggett & Myers Tobacco Co., Fine v. Philip Morris, Inc. consisted of patients blaming cigarettes for their current health conditions and wanting tobacco companies to be held liable. Many of these cases were victories for tobacco companies, often being that litigants in the beginning of this new era of lawsuits against tobacco were not able to prove the concrete association between smoking and diseases aforementioned.

By the 1970s, the cultural tide on smoking had once again changed. With medical evidence more advanced than in previous decades, the association between smoking and diseases like cancer was becoming ever more prevalent, leaving tobacco companies less options to hide from this truth. Furthermore, the Surgeon General's Warning in 1964 served as a final piece needed to close the gap between the two concepts. In addition to liability laws being changed from the time of the 1950s, plaintiffs no longer had to prove negligence on the part of the company with regards to their product but expose a defect. With the restrictions becoming more laxed, new lawsuits surged once again against tobacco companies.

Life of Rose Cipollone 
Rose Cipollone began smoking at the age of sixteen. She continually smoked Chesterfield cigarettes—up to a pack and a half a pack per day. It wasn't until she was pregnant and at her husband  Antonio Cipollone's request that she attempted to quit smoking. Though she cut down on her regular smoking of a pack and a half per day, she still secretly smoked during her pregnancy. In 1955,  Rose switched to Liggett and Myer brand of cigarettes on the basis that their “pure white Miracle Tip” filter appeared to be a healthier alternative compared to Chesterfield Cigarettes.  In 1968, Rose switched to smoking Parliament brand cigarettes, citing conditions attributed to her health as her reasoning. Parliaments were advertised to have a recessed filter and lower tar content than that of other competitive cigarette brands. Finally, Rose switched to Lorillard's True cigarettes under the recommendation of her physician. Her options at this point were to either quit smoking or switch to this brand of cigarette with its advertised plastic filter inserts. Rose chose the latter option, and continued to smoke with the suggested brand of her physician.

While Rose was trying to decide which brand of cigarettes was right for her, she simultaneously was suffering the health effects of smoking. In the mid-1960s, Rose began to develop a smokers’ cough, as well as problems such as chest pain and hypertension. In 1981, doctors found a carcinomatous spot on her right lung and performed a partial lung resection. After the multitudes of consultations and operations so far in her life, Rose still continued to smoke, “though often now in secret", claimed Rose from an unknown source. In 1982, the cancer had spread to her lower and middle right lung, and Cipollone had surgery to remove the entire lung as well as a large adrenal mass in 1983. Rose Cipollone died on October 24, 1984, after her lung cancer had spread and become inoperable.

It wasn't until the year before Rose Cipollone's death that she met Marc Edell. Recommended by her chest surgeon, Marc Edell was skilled in the art of going after companies and their negligence to protect consumer health. Edell had previously represented the Asbestos Companies in their defense in regard to the health-related claims brought against them. From that case, Edell became familiar with “pulmonary pathology and risks of smoking” and became interested in litigation against the tobacco industry. In need of a client, Edell took on Cipollone's case and filed suit in U.S. District Court for the District of New Jersey against Liggett and Myers, Philip Morris, and Lorillard composed of fourteen tort complaints on August 1, 1983, just over a year before her death. The action was brought in federal court as a Diversity of citizenship case.

Trial

First case 
Edell planned to argue a case based on the cause of Cipollone's death: nicotine from her cigarettes. He gathered facts to bring a series of claims to the court that argued the following:
 Tobacco companies had failed to and were negligent in putting better designs of cigarettes on the market when they had the resources to do so
 They had committed fraud by failing to act on their knowledge of the harms of smoking 
 They had failed to fully inform the public of the true risks of smoking 
 The cigarette makers had breached express warranty by making health claims in their advertising and promotions, which fraudulently overshadowed the mandated health warnings 
 There was a conspiracy by tobacco companies to prevent other third party groups from releasing health information on the hazards of cigarettes  
 Pain and suffering were alleged results of her illness and under the liability rules and law should be compensated for  
Liggett and Myers, Philip Morris, and Lorillard all cited the  1965 Federal Cigarette Labeling and Advertisement Act. The companies argued the act supported preempted independent state regulation of tobacco and therefore prevented state litigation, making the tobacco industry immune to suits. From there, they moved to dismiss the case. The trial judge, H. Lee Sarokin, ruled in favor of Cipollone, stating that while state legislatures are prohibited from requiring specific warning labels and regulation of them, Edell's tactic of calling into question the inadequacy of the ones already present under the government was acceptable. The ruling was later overturned on interlocutory appeal by the U.S. Court of Appeals for the Third Circuit. However,  the appellate court did allow the case to be retried in district court on the condition that no claims regarding advertisement and promotion could be made. Edell accepted that condition and prepared for retrial.

Second case 
In the retrial, Edell was not allowed to enter evidence claiming that Liggett & Myers had worked on the creation of a safer cigarette. He also was not allowed to bring evidence regarding the tobacco industry's “duty to warn” of the dangers of cigarette smoking.

Edell strengthened his case with his access to 300,000 pages of internal documents of the tobacco companies. These documents included compelling and damaging evidence that the tobacco companies had proof, backed by research dating back to the 1940s, that nicotine was addictive and potentially carcinogenic. Before the trial could begin however, the battle over the use of these documents was carried out. The tobacco companies unsuccessfully struggled to suppress the evidence papers obtained by Edell on the grounds that it would "divulge trade secrets"; the trial court judge, Sarokin, ruled that the people and the court had the Constitutional right to know what the companies know and granted the use of the papers. The tobacco companies still made an effort to thwart the efforts of Edell to use the papers. They not only appealed to the Third Circuit Court of Appeals, which upheld the ruling, but also the Supreme Court, which declined to hear the case. It was established that the evidence would be used in trial.

Alongside the tobacco industry documents, Edell argued that the powerful advertising for the brands Cipollone smoked was an unscrupulous strategy utilized by the tobacco industry to not only overshadow the warning labels mandated by the federal government, but also to promote cigarette use and nicotine addiction as a marketing strategy for company profit. Edell also claimed that Cipollone's tobacco use stemmed from her nicotine addiction, which was encouraged by the advertising of Liggett and Myers, Philip Morris, and Lorillard by the use of both health claims and advertising. Edell made sure that Cipollone was portrayed as a woman who was disparaged by her powerful addiction to the tobacco industry's product; expert testimony showed that she even displayed withdrawal symptoms, sometimes digging through “the trash for butts when she ran out of cigarettes”. Edell was heavily committed to the case. He was seen working seven days a week and spending his every waking minute on the case. He sacrificed time with both his wife and children to ensure his arguments were strong. After presenting his case that the tobacco industry's advertising of cigarettes and knowledge of risk related to Cipollone's claims, the tobacco companies' defense moved for dismissal. The motion was denied. They were going to have to answer to Edell's claims.

The tobacco industry argued that Rose Cipollone was fully aware of the risks of smoking both before and during her cigarette use. "She was an independent woman, making an independent decision to continue smoking, and she was in control, not the nicotine" claimed the tobacco industries. Furthermore, even if the cigarettes had caused her death, it was in no way the responsibility of the industry. As research and the industry documents were used in trial, Edell failed to show any explicit proof that lung cancer is linked directly to smoking. Furthermore, expert testimony revealed that the type of lung cancer affecting Cipollone was not associated with smoking. Cipollone's constant switching between “healthier” brands also showed her acknowledgment of the dangers of smoking, argued by the defense.

Ruling

District Court 
The jury deliberated for 6 days, and reached the verdict on June 3, 1988—considering the conspiracy claims and the lack of expression in warranty and warning argued by Edell. The jury was composed of 3 non-smokers, 2 former smokers, and 1 smoker. The group of 6 had concluded that:
 Cipollone was 80% at fault, based on their assessment of her personal choice to smoke being a factor
 All claims for failure to warn were dropped against Philip Morris and Lorillard, since Cipollone began smoking their cigarettes after the 1966 federally mandated warning labels appeared on the packages
 Only Liggett & Myers could be held liable, as Cipollone smoked their cigarettes before the 1966 warning labels
 Court ruled that the company did in fact contribute to her death.
 The jury awarded $400,000 in damages to Mr. Antonio Cipollone, who had continued to fight the case after his wife's death.
 The claim regarding the tobacco industry's withholding of a production of a safer cigarette was dismissed on the grounds that it involved speculation to  whether Cipollone would have in fact chosen to smoke the safer option if given the opportunity
Edell was pleased that they had received some monetary reward and saw it as a victory. However, he comments on his hope that the courts would've gone further with their condemnation of big tobacco in an interview sometime after the ruling.

Court of Appeals 
After the District Court Ruling, the tobacco companies appealed to the Court of Appeals of the Third Circuit in hopes of reversing the verdict.

In 1990, the Third Circuit appellate court threw out the verdict and:
 Set aside the $400,000 in damages on the grounds that there was no proof that Cipollone relied on the Liggett & Myers advertisements in question.
 Allowed Edell to file suit on the basis of design and advertising. He was able to claim that prior to the 1966 Federal Cigarette Labeling and Advertisement Act, tobacco companies did not inform the average unaware smoker on the dangers of smoking while they in fact knew this information.
 Edell could argue the case that the tobacco industry could be held liable on a live claim that the company made Cipollone unaware of the product's dangers outweighing the benefits.
Five days after the appellate ruling, Antonio Cipollone died, Rose Cipollone's son continued on with the case after her husband's death. Both the plaintiff and the defense in this case were looking for a concrete doctrine regarding the ability to litigate regarding preemption, state regulation of tobacco, and the Act cited in the first trial of the case.

Supreme Court 
The Supreme Court addressed the issue of preemption of federal law in regard to state law regulating the tobacco industry and whether common law damages constitute a requirement based on smoking and health based on state law in regard to advertisements and promotion. The Cigarette Labeling and Advertising Act of 1966, which excludes all manufacturers who label their packages with proper warnings from requirement or prohibition, led the majority of the court to the opinion that: 
 The filing of a “failure-to-warn” claim against the tobacco industry by Edell was invalid and prohibited 
 Cases involving the neutralization of federal warnings in advertisements on the grounds that the Act preempted, or overrode, state laws were also invalid and prohibited 
 Limited common law claims preempted by statute   
The majority ruling by the Supreme Court limited the potential litigants in lawsuits against tobacco industries to only smokers who developed diseases prior to 1969. The opinion did not exclude fraud and conspiracy or express warranty, as section 5b of the 1969 Act does not explicitly define this;

The Supreme Court also stated that if the plaintiff, Edell and Cipollone's son in this case, could prove any of the following:

 the industry conspired to hide evidence concerning the harms of smoking
 or lied to the public about them,
 or if express warranties were breached

then a new case can be filed, as there is no discussion of tort litigation or damage claims in the Act. 

The concurring opinion of the court found that no damage claims were preempted rather than not discussed. The dissenting justices found that all state laws were preempted by the act.

Public outcry and media attention 

The case caught the attention of many: Congress, Wall Street, and legal communities across the country. Legal communities, those opposed to and supportive of tobacco companies, analyzed the victor in the trials and what it entailed for future liability suits against tobacco companies. Congressional leaders watched, some supporters of big tobacco and others some of its strongest critics. A new conversation in the public forum had been opened with Cipollone v Liggett Group Inc, with the public becoming more informed on the dangers of smoking. However, this can only be said for a small few, as others did know the dangers before the case and the warning of Surgeon General Terry. The smoking population stayed constant through the trial, with no substantial change occurring during the course of the trials. .

Aftermath

The U.S. Supreme Court remanded Cipollone v. Liggett Group, Inc. for a new trial. The retrial never occurred; the $400,000 verdict for Cipollone from the original trial was far eclipsed by the exorbitant costs and length of the lawsuit. Since the case was filed, almost half the ten years was spent on post-trial matters. In 1988, Phillip Morris was quoted as saying: "Almost 200 lawsuits have been brought in the last five and a half years and the cigarette manufacturers have not ... paid a penny to settle one." As of 1992, the law firms handling Cipollone and seven other tobacco litigation cases had "incurred approximately $1.2 million in out-of-pocket expenses ... The firms have also spent well over $5 million in lawyer and paralegal time".

Rose Cipollone's son filed for a voluntary withdrawal of the lawsuit on November 4, 1992. Six other tobacco liability cases were withdrawn the same month as well. The firm handling Cipollone was denied withdrawal in the last remaining case, Haines v. Liggett Group, Inc. Haines dragged on for another decade and then some, until a settlement order was approved on April 13, 2004.

Legacy 
Cipollone v. Liggett Group, Inc. was one of the costliest liability lawsuits spanning the course of five years. Tobacco companies before the case were succeeding in the court room—no  plaintiffs had ever been like Edell in previous cases. Many earlier plaintiffs were not able to make the scientific correlation between smoking cigarettes and the diseases that are linked to them. Many plaintiffs were out financed by big tobacco companies as well, with companies having what seemed to be unlimited pools of financial resources while plaintiffs struggled with countless court fees. With Cipollone v Liggett Inc, finances were not a major problem for Edell and his team. They were the first to introduce the concept of a conspiracy by tobacco companies to keep the public misinformed on the dangers of smoking and that there was a "safer cigarette"  hidden in the shadows. After the case, tobacco companies viewed the ruling as a victory in their favor. However, this proclamation did not stop a wave of hundreds of lawsuits to follow in liability after Cipollone v Liggett Inc. Cipollone v Liggett Group Inc is viewed by some commentators as a monumental achievement in the anti-tobacco crusade.

However, many say that even with the surge in liability lawsuits against tobacco companies, it will be hard for any more progress to ensue. The same problems are still standing in the way of future plaintiffs who decide to go after big tobacco:
 The financial resources of tobacco companies surpasses that of all plaintiffs 
 The limitations placed by the Supreme Court on who can still litigate against tobacco companies ( those who developed diseases prior to 1969)
 If the argument of smoking being free choice is still intact, there will always be blame to put on the plaintiff and cannot solely rest on tobacco companies

References

External links

United States Supreme Court cases
United States Supreme Court cases of the Rehnquist Court
United States federal preemption law
United States tobacco case law
1992 in United States case law
Liggett Group
Smoking in the United States